Abacarus is a genus of acari, including the following species:
 Abacarus acutatus Sukhareva, 1985
 Abacarus doctus Navia et al., 2011
 Abacarus hystrix (Nalepa, 1896)
 Abacarus lolii Skoracka, 2009
 Abacarus sacchari Channabasavanna, 1966

References

Eriophyidae
Trombidiformes genera